Brunellia is a genus of trees. They are distributed in the mountainous regions of southern Mexico, Central America, West Indies, and South America. Brunellia is the only genus in the family Brunelliaceae. As of 2001 there were about 54 species.

Species

References

 
Oxalidales genera
Taxonomy articles created by Polbot